The following lists the top 25 singles of 2005  in Australia from the Australian Recording Industry Association (ARIA) End of Year singles chart.

"The Prayer" by Anthony Callea was the biggest song of the year, peaking at #1 for five weeks and staying in the top 50 for 17 weeks. The longest stay at #1 was by The Pussycat Dolls with "Don't Cha" which spent 7 weeks at the top spot.

References

Australian record charts
2005 in Australian music
Australia Top 25 singles